College of Management may refer to:

India
 College of Defence Management, India
 SIES College of Management Studies (SIESCOMS), Mumbai, India

U.S.
 Eller College of Management, of the University of Arizona, US
 Georgia Institute of Technology College of Management, US
 Jenkins Graduate College of Management of North Carolina State University, US

Elsewhere
 American College of Management and Technology, Dubrovnik, Croatia
 Army Public College of Management Sciences, Rawalpindi, Pakistan
 College of Healthcare Management, Fukuoka, Japan
 College of Management Academic Studies, Rishon LeZion, Israel
 College of Management in Trenčín, Slovakia
 College of Management, Mahidol University, Bangkok, Thailand
 Diwan College of Management, Taiwan
 Holmes Institute, Australia
 International College of Management, Sydney, Australia
 Kathmandu College of Management, Nepal